Dunham Massey Hall, usually known simply as Dunham Massey, is an English country house in the parish of Dunham Massey in the district of Trafford, near Altrincham, Greater Manchester. During World War I it was temporarily used as the Stamford Military Hospital.

It was designated a Grade I listed building on 5 March 1959. It has been owned by the National Trust since the death of Roger Grey, 10th and last Earl of Stamford in 1976.

Dunham Massey was re-built in the early 18th century by George Booth, 2nd Earl of Warrington. He had inherited an older mansion from his father, which was in a terrible state of repair.

There were significant alterations, especially internally, at the start of the 20th century. It has historic formal gardens and a deer park. The park and gardens are listed Grade II* on the Register of Historic Parks and Gardens.

Location 
Dunham Massey is s an English country house in the parish of Dunham Massey in the district of Trafford, near Altrincham, Greater Manchester. It was formerly in the ancient parish of Bowdon, Cheshire.

History 
'Old' Sir George Booth, 1st Baronet built the first mansion on the site in the early 17th-century. However, the house remained uncompleted by the time of his death and was only completed after the Civil War in the later 17th century by his grandson, 'Young' George Booth, 1st Baron Delamer. He inherited family debts, and spent a considerable amount of energy investing in the future of Dunham Massey Hall; he planted trees to sell for timber, and worked to recoup unpaid debts. The clock tower is inscribed with that date, suggesting that was when improvements were made to the stables. In the 1730s, John Norris was brought in to redesign the whole mansion by the 2nd Earl of Warrington, with a design of brick façade accentuated by bays and a stone centrepiece.

George Booth, 2nd Earl of Warrington died in 1758, and in a move remarkable for the eighteenth century, ensured that his only child, a daughter, Lady Mary Booth (1704-1772), would inherit and control the estate. She married her cousin, Harry Grey, 4th Earl of Stamford (1736 - 1768), whose family properties included his estate of Enville Hall. Lady Mary oversaw the remodelling of the landscape at Dunham Massey, some of which, outside the park wall, that was reputedly undertaken by Lancelot Capability Brown. Their son, George Harry Grey, 5th Earl of Stamford and Warrington, inherited both Dunham Massey and Enville Hall, along with other properties. In the 1780s he commissioned a remodelling of the Great Gallery  and the south front of the house by architect John Hope. He died in 1819, and his son, also George Harry Grey, but the 6th Earl of Stamford and Warrington, inherited the estate and began to introduce modernisations to the house.

The 6th Earl died in 1845, and his grandson, George Harry Grey, inherited and became the 7th Earl of Stamford. He married twice, first to Elizabeth (Bessie) King Billage, a shoemaker's daughter from Cambridge; the second to Catherine Cocks, a circus performer. However, the local gentry rejected his choices of wife, which led him to leave Dunham Massey and move to Enville Hall. The house was managed by Robert Cox, Catherine's nephew, and rented to tenants for periods in the subsequent fifty years. The descendants of Catherine's niece Sarah Letitia Cox, still occupy Enville Hall today.

The 7th Earl died in 1883, and his cousin, the Reverend Harry Grey inherited the title of 8th Earl of Stamford, but never lived at Dunham. At the time of his inheritance, he was living in South Africa, having left England due to alcohol and gambling addictions. He married three times: his first wife Susan Gaydon died in 1869; his second wife Annie Macnamara died in 1874. His third wife, Martha Grey, Countess of Stamford, a Khoekhoe woman, was the daughter of a freed, formerly enslaved, woman. She and the 8th Earl married in 1880. They had two children already, John and Frances, and their third, Mary, was born after they married. Despite their marriage being recognised by South African law at the time, it was not recognised under English law. This meant that at the 8th Earl's death in 1890, his son, John, could not inherit, and the title passed to William Grey, 9th Earl of Stamford, who was the nephew of the 7th Earl. He inherited the title, but no assets, until the death of the 7th Countess, Catherine Cox, in 1905. With his wife, Penelope Theobald, they led a programme of restoration for the house.

The house was modified in 1905–1908 by architect Compton Hall, and by interior designer Percy Macquoid, in preparation for its reoccupation by William Grey, 9th Earl of Stamford. However, the 9th Earl died in 1910, just as the family was due to move in. Until these modifications, the southern front of the building had 11 three-storey bays; in order to make the building look more 17th-century in style, the third, fourth, eighth, and ninth bays were reduced to two stories with dormers, and a centrepiece of three bays was added, with columns each side of the central bay as well as stone pediments.

William Grey died in 1910 and was succeeded by his son, Roger Grey, 10th Earl of Stamford, who donated the house, its contents, and the 3000 acre estate to the National Trust at his death in 1976. At the time it was the Trust's most generous bequest in its history.

Stamford Military Hospital 

During World War I, Penelope Grey, Countess of Stamford, wife of the 9th Earl of Stamford, made the house available to the Red Cross as a military hospital, becoming known as the Stamford Military Hospital from April 1917 to January 1919. It hosted 182 injured soldiers who had suffered injuries and needed medical care, but not life-threatening, ranging from gas poisoning to bullets in the brain. The hospital was run by Sister Catherine Bennett. Lady Stamford's daughter, Lady Jane Grey (later Turnbull), trained as a nurse at the hospital.

From 1 March 2014 until 11 November 2016, the main ward at Stamford Military Hospital  (known as "Baghdad"), along with the operating theatre, nurses' station and the recreation room were recreated to commemorate the 100-year anniversary of the start of World War I, along with actors playing the role of characters who worked, lived and recovered at the hospital.

Collections 

Dunham Massey contains one of the most significant collections of Huguenot silver, largely collected by George Booth, 2nd Earl of Warrington. During his 64 years at Dunham Massey, he accumulated over 1000 pieces of silver. One sixth of the original plate remains at Dunham Massey, with much of the collection being dispersed by the Countess of Stamford and Warrington (who died in 1905), widow of George Harry Grey, 7th Earl of Stamford and Warrington (died 1883). The 10th Earl, Roger Grey, expended much money and effort in returning family heirlooms originally from Dunham Massey.

There is a fine collection of oil paintings and watercolours. The relief wood-carving of the Crucifixion by Grinling Gibbons, which hangs in the Library, is the earliest known work by the 17th-century wood carver. It is on this piece of work he was working when he was discovered by John Evelyn in 1671.  A group of paintings of the house and estate, known as the Harris Views, showing the 1730s mansion, were described by Simon Jenkins as "the most remarkable topographical survey of any country house and its grounds to remain in situ." There is also one painting is from 1690 by Adrien van Diest showing the earlier Elizabethan mansion. Another significant work in the art collection is an Allegory of Time by Guercino.

A life-sized statue of an exoticised black man wearing only a skirt of feathers, in a kneeling position and holding a sundial above his head, was previously situated at the front of the house. It is believed to have originally been a personification of Africa, produced by the sculptor Andries Carpentière in  after a figure by John van Nost for King William III's privy garden at Hampton Court. In June 2020, after numerous calls were made for the removal of statues in Britain with links to the slave trade in the wake of the murder of George Floyd, the National Trust said that the decision had been made to move the statue.

Other buildings 

The chapel has oak panelling, pews and reredos. The silk wallcoverings in the chapel are a modern recreation, based on the original silk fabric, made in 2015–16. The double courtyard house is built of Flemish bond brick, stone dressings, and a roof of Westmorland and Welsh slate.

The Carriage House, south of the kitchen courtyard, is also Grade I listed. It has a clock turret, which displays a date of 1721.

Also south of the Hall are the stable buildings, also Grade I listed. They probably date from 1721, but the west side was extended in the 18th century. The Stables Restaurant is located in the upstairs of the South Stables, with an ice-cream parlour below.

Gardens and park 

It has historic formal gardens and a deer park. The park and gardens are listed Grade II* on the Register of Historic Parks and Gardens. The park is also a Site of Special Scientific Interest, based on the significance of its mature timber fauna. The 300 acre deer park at Dunham Massey dates back to medieval times.

As of 2012 the gardens housed over 700 plant species, as well as 1,600 trees and shrubs; it hosts the largest winter garden in Britain. The Winter Garden has many snowdrops, daffodils and bluebells.

The oldest surviving building on the Dunham Estate is the watermill, first used as a corn mill, then a saw mill. During the Second World War the eastern part of the estate was requisitioned for use first as a US Army camp and later repurposed as Dunham Massey POW Camp.

Listing and ownership 
The stately home was designated a Grade I listed building on 5 March 1959. It has been owned by the National Trust since the death of the 10th and last Earl of Stamford in 1976. Over 439,000 people visited the site in 2020/21, making it one of the National Trust's top ten most popular sites; it was also the only site whose visitor figures increased during the COVID-19 pandemic.

See also

Grade I listed buildings in Greater Manchester
Listed buildings in Dunham Massey

Notes

References 
Jenkins, Simon, England's Thousand Best Houses, 2003, Allen Lane,  (gives 3 stars)

External links

List of paintings on view

Cracroft's Peerage: Earls of Stamford and Warrington

Burial sites of the Grey family
Country houses in Greater Manchester
Grade I listed buildings in Greater Manchester
Grade I listed houses
Grade II* listed parks and gardens
Historic house museums in Greater Manchester
Houses completed in the 17th century
Medical museums in England
National Trust properties in Cheshire
World War I museums in the United Kingdom